Lawrence Joseph Bettencourt (September 22, 1905 – September 15, 1978) was an American football and baseball player. He played professionally in Major League Baseball (MLB) as an outfielder and third baseman for the St. Louis Browns and in the National Football League (NFL) as a center for the Green Bay Packers.

A member of the College Football Hall of Fame, Bettencourt helped lift Saint Mary's College of California, a small college located in Moraga, California to national prominence. On the defensive side of the ball, Bettencourt became an expert at rushing the punter. During his four-year varsity career, he scored 12 touchdowns, most of them on blocked kicks. As a senior in 1927, he blocked punts in six consecutive games. His offensive play helped gain him All-American honors. During his four years St. Mary's, the school posted a 33–5–2 record.

After graduation, he signed a baseball contract with the St. Louis Browns for $6,000, which was then the largest bonus ever paid a rookie just out of school. In 1933, he played in the NFL for the Green Bay Packers.

In 168 major league games over three seasons (1928, 1931-32), Bettencourt posted a .258 batting average (102-for-395) with 61 runs, 8 home runs, 53 RBIs and 60 walks.

References

External links
 
 
 

1905 births
1978 deaths
American football centers
Major League Baseball right fielders
Major League Baseball third basemen
Green Bay Packers players
Saint Mary's Gaels baseball players
Saint Mary's Gaels football players
St. Louis Browns players
All-American college football players
College Football Hall of Fame inductees
People from Newark, California
Players of American football from California
Sportspeople from Alameda County, California
Baseball players from California